The common dolphin (Delphinus delphis) is the most abundant cetacean in the world, with a global population of about six million. Despite this fact and its vernacular name, the common dolphin is not thought of as the archetypal dolphin, with that distinction belonging to the bottlenose dolphin due to its popular appearances in aquaria and the media. However, the common dolphin is often depicted in Ancient Greek and Roman art and culture, most notably in a mural painted by the Greek Minoan civilization.

It is presently the only member of the genus Delphinus. The common dolphin belongs to the subfamily Delphininae, making this dolphin closely related to the three different species of bottlenose dolphins, humpback dolphins, striped dolphins, spinner dolphins, clymene dolphin, spotted dolphins, fraser's dolphin and the tucuxi and guiana dolphin. The common dolphin was originally categorized into two different species (now thought to be ecotypes), the short-beaked common dolphin and the long-beaked common dolphin. However, recent evidence has shown that many populations of long-beaked common dolphins around the world are not closely related to one another and are often derived from a short-beaked ancestor and do not always share common derived characteristics. For this reason, they are no longer considered different species.

Physical characteristics
Males are generally longer and heavier. The color pattern on the body is unusual. The back is dark and the belly is white, while on each side is an hourglass pattern colored light grey, yellow, or gold in front and dirty grey in back. They have long, thin rostra with up to 50–60 small, sharp, interlocking teeth on each side of each jaw.

Taxonomy

Despite the historic practice of lumping the entire genus Delphinus into a single species, these widely distributed dolphins exhibit a wide variety of sizes, shapes and colors. Indeed, over the past few decades, over 20 distinct species in the genus have been proposed. Scientists in California in the 1960s concluded there were two species — the long-beaked and short-beaked. The long-beaked common dolphin was thought to have a disjointed range in coastal areas in tropical and warmer temperate oceans.  The range included parts of western and southern Africa, much of western South America, central California to central Mexico, coastal Peru, areas around Japan, Korea and Taiwan, and possibly near Oman. Vagrants have been recorded as far north as Vancouver Island.

This analysis was seemingly confirmed by a more in-depth genetic study in the 1990s. This study also suggested a third species (D. tropicalis, common name usually Arabian common dolphin or Indo-Pacific common dolphin), characterized by an extremely long and thin beak and found in the Red Sea and Indian Ocean, might be distinguished from the long-beaked species. The current standard taxonomic works recognize this as a subspecies of D. delphis rather than a separate species.

Recent evidence has demonstrated that different populations of long-beaked common dolphins around the world are not closely related to one another and are often derived from a short-beaked ancestor (as well as not sharing common derived characters). Therefore, long-beaked and short-beaked common dolphins are now listed  as the same species under the scientific name of Delphinus delphis. Currently, the common dolphin is divided into four subspecies:
D. d. delphis, the nominate subspecies
D. d. bairdii, the  Eastern North Pacific long-beaked common dolphin
D. d. ponticus, the Black Sea common dolphin
D. d. tropicalis, the Indo-Pacific common dolphin

Fossil record
Many extinct cetacean species were once lumped into Delphinus, but have since been placed in other genera. In the late 19th century several fossil species were described, including taxa: Delphinus baltringii, Delphinus delannoy and Delphinus domeykoi. However, these species are no longer considered valid. Another species known as Delphinus brevidens was reassigned to the genus Stereodelphis which is now generally considered synonymous with Squalodon.

Natural history

Common dolphins live in both warm-temperate and tropical waters ranging from 40–60°N to 50°S. Long-beaked common dolphins mostly inhabit shallow, warm coastal water. Short-beaked common dolphins are common "along shelf edges and in areas with sharp bottom relief such as seamounts and escarpments". Common dolphins have a varied diet consisting of many species of fish and squid. This includes both mesopelagic species and epipelagic schooling species.

Common dolphins are a widely distributed species. They can be found around the world in both offshore and coastal waters. In the Northwest Atlantic, they can be found from Cape Hatteras North Carolina, to Newfoundland and are strongly associated with the Gulf Stream. Dolphins in this region can often be found in areas that have certain geological factors like underwater canyons and ridges because this is where up-welling occurs which result in greater nutrients. In the Eastern Pacific, common dolphins are found along the coast of California and are associated with the California current. Short-beaked Common dolphins can also be found in Europe, particularly the Scotian shelf, the Black Sea and the Mediterranean. In the Southern Hemisphere, they are abundant in the southwestern Pacific, around New Zealand and southern Australia. They are generally a pelagic species that are often found in waters 650–6,500 feet deep, with the short-beaked type preferring deeper waters than the long-beaked type Temperature also plays a large role in the congregation of dolphins. For example, in the Western North Atlantic, almost all sightings of Common dolphins took place in waters from 16 to 20 °C. However, there were common dolphin sightings in waters as low as 5 °C.

Common dolphins can live in aggregations of hundreds or even thousands of dolphins. Common dolphins are often seen in groups numbering several hundred individuals (with subgroups consisting of 20-30 individuals). Occasionally, different groups will come together to form mega-pods which can consist of over 10,000 dolphins. Genetic studies in the Northeast Atlantic suggest that common dolphin pods generally do not consist of close kin, but rather of members that are not closely related. Unlike many delphinids, common dolphins do not live in a matriarchal society. That being said, closely related individuals are usually found in similar geographical locations fairly consistently, providing evidence that this species displays site fidelity (at least in the Northeastern Atlantic). Male common dolphins display greater site fidelity in relation to their kin than females. Common dolphin pod structure often consists of nursery pods (which includes females and calves), bachelor pods (consisting of all males) and mixed groups of males and females, including sub-adults and calves. Genetic evidence seems to indicate that common dolphins live in fission-fusion societies, where dolphins form pods that are not necessarily stable and do not necessarily consist of related individuals. It is not known if common dolphins form lifelong bonds with other individuals  like the long-term male alliances seen in bottlenose dolphins.

There is some evidence that common dolphins use signature whistles, similar to that of the bottlenose dolphin. These whistles are believed to serve as an acoustic label, and provide identification information similar to that of a name.  It takes approximately 1 year for a calf to learn its signature whistle after which it remains stable for the rest of a dolphin's life. In South Africa, as many as 29 common dolphin signature whistle types were detected. However, it was difficult to determine if each dolphin had its own signature whistle due to the vast number of dolphins present (over 1,000) and anthropogenic background noise. Additionally, considering the vast number of dolphins present and  taking into account their feeding and diving behavior, it appears that common dolphin signature whistles are also used for group cohesion. Another hypothesis for the function of signature whistles, is that they serve as a beacon for lost individuals.

Common dolphins sometimes associate with other dolphin species, such as pilot whales.  In the Gulf of Corinth, common dolphins frequently display mixed species association, especially with striped and Rissos’ dolphins. Over one third of all dolphin sightings in the gulf consisted of mixed species associations that partially consisted of common dolphins. In mixed species associations, the ratio of striped to common dolphins ranged from 6-11:1. When Rissos’ dolphins were present (there would usually be only one or two individuals), it appeared that much of their scars were the result of interactions between striped and spinner dolphins. In much of the interactions, the Rissos’ dolphins would chase and herd the common dolphins toward the boat, while the common dolphins would try and swim under the Rissos’ dolphin. When groups of common and striped dolphins would charge at each other, the Rissos’ dolphin would chase the striped dolphins. Sometimes these interactions appeared to be playful, and at other times aggressive. Synchronized swimming and surfacing was commonly observed. These interactions take place in the deepest part of the Gulf, furthest from shore and usually consist of a total of 60 dolphins from all three species.

There have been confirmed cases of hybridization between striped and common dolphins in this region. There have been 15 cases of common dolphin and striped dolphin hybrids. Genetic and observational evidence has demonstrated that the hybrids are fertile and are capable of not only reproducing with other hybrids, but are capable of reproducing with each of the parent species. Striped dolphins have been known to mate with other dolphins, as the Clymene dolphin is the result of hybrid speciation between striped and spinner dolphins. However, this is unlikely to happen with common dolphins, as their population in the Gulf of Corinth is too low. Common dolphins and bottlenose dolphins have been known to interbreed in captivity. There is one confirmed case of a hybrid between a bottlenose and common dolphin in Southern Spain, an important feeding ground for both species. The mother was a female bottlenose dolphin (dubbed as Billie) who has spent 10 years within a common dolphin pod. Billie was observed assisting common calves reach the surface at three different intervals and would babysit the calves after the mother went through labor. The length of the calf was similar to a bottlenose dolphin calf, with the lateral stripes and coloration of a common dolphin. The calf was spotted with its mother, almost daily on dolphin watching tours among a nursery pod of common dolphins which also contained some immature striped dolphins. Sightings of the calf took place when temperatures were between 14 and 26 °C. The calf was mainly observed swimming in the echelon position (swimming alongside the mother). The calf was found rubbing its head on its mother, jumping backwards over its mother and flipper-to flipper, belly-to flipper and belly-to belly contact was observed. They have also been observed bow riding on baleen whales, and they also bow ride on boats. They are fast swimmers and breaching behavior and aerial acrobatics are common with this species. They are also known to display altruistic behaviors to support injured members.

The short-beaked common dolphin has a gestation period of 10 to 11 months. For the Black Sea population, weaning occurs at between five and six months, but occurs later (up to about 19 months) in other areas. Typical interbirth interval ranges from one year for the Black Sea population to three years for eastern Pacific Ocean populations. Age of sexual maturity also varies by location, but can range between two and seven years for females and three and 12 years for males. No evidence exists of any major reproductive differences between the two species. In captivity, the long-beaked common dolphin has hybridized with the common bottlenose dolphin (Tursiops truncatus). One of the hybrids has been bred back to a bottlenose dolphin, demonstrating such hybrids are fertile.

Human interactions

Conservation

The common dolphin is probably the most abundant cetacean species on the planet, and the overall species is listed as Least Concern on the IUCN Red List, indicating that it is in no danger of extinction. Abundance has been estimated for most major portions of the species range in the Northern Hemisphere, but only for a few places in the Southern Hemisphere.  In the Pacific Ocean, there are an estimated 1,428,000 off Japan and in the temperate central Pacific Ocean, 969,000 off the U.S. west coast (Carretta et al. 2019); and 2,963,000 in the eastern tropical Pacific. In the Atlantic Ocean, 70,000 are estimated for the western Atlantic Ocean (Waring et al. 2019); 467,000 for European waters; more than 19,400 for the Mediterranean Sea; and several tens of thousands for the Black Sea.  In the southern part of the Indo-Pacific Ocean, there are an estimated 20,000-22,000 common dolphins in a small portion of southern Australia (Bilgmann et al. 2017), and 15,000-20,000 off southern Africa.  There are no estimates for the population of dolphins in the northern Indian Ocean.  Taken together, these estimates suggest that well over six million common dolphins inhabit the World's oceans.

Common dolphins face a mixture of threats due to human influence. Moderate levels of metal pollutants, which are thought to negatively impact dolphin health, have been measured in some populations. Populations have been hunted off the coast of Peru for use as food and shark bait. In most other areas, the dolphins have not been hunted directly. Several thousand individuals have been caught in industrial trawler nets throughout their range.

Bycatch is the main threat that common dolphins face today. Short-beaked common dolphins are taken as cetacean bycatch the most in all of Europe, given that they are the most abundant dolphin in the Eastern Atlantic. About 1000 short-beaked common dolphins are bycaught in the North Atlantic each year by either tuna drift, trawling and gillnetting. The regulation is that only cetacean bycatch can not be longer than 15 meters  and this can lead to be a problem because short-beaked common dolphins are only about 2.7 meters. Common dolphin bycatch is a particularly important issue in Galicia Spain, via trawler fishing. The bycatch of short beaked dolphins in Galicia from May to September from 2001 to 2002, consisted of 394 individuals annually. Depth was an important factor in bycatch, as incidental capture mostly took place along the continental shelf in water less than 300 m deep. Very few entrapments took place when the depth exceeded 300 m. Time of day was also important as most dolphins became trapped in trawling nets at night (most active feeding takes place at night). Most of the dolphins captured were males and had a mean age of 13+- 4.4 years. It is believed that the reason why the vast majority of bycatch consisted of males is because bachelor pods appear to be particularly abundant in Galicia from the May–October season. This fact reinforces the hypothesis that common dolphins may be sexually segregated in the Northeast Atlantic. If there was a ban on fishing in Galicia in waters than less than 250 m deep, and if there were seasonal closures, it is estimated that 78% of the dolphins would not have been caught. In the Western North Atlantic, dolphins are vulnerable to swordfish driftnet fishing, with the number of males being caught as bycatch, doubling the number of females. It was also found from stranding samples that males tend to strand more. This provides evidence of sex-based habitat partitioning or pod congregation.  

Common dolphins were abundant in the western Mediterranean Sea until the 1960s but occurrences there have tailed off rapidly. The reasons are not well understood, but are believed to be due to extensive human activity in the area. In the US, they are a protected species and sometimes are caught by accident in some trawler nets as by-catch, though despite this they are still quite common throughout their range. Despite these potential threats, the short-beaked common dolphin is considered to be Least Concern by the IUCN Red List, and the long-beaked common dolphin is listed as Data Deficient.

The short-beaked common dolphin Delphinus delphis is listed globally on Appendix II of the Convention on the Conservation of Migratory Species of Wild Animals (CMS). As amended by the Conference of the Parties in 1985, 1988, 1991, 1994, 1997, 1999, 2002, 2005 and 2008. Effective: 5 March 2009 of the Convention on the Conservation of Migratory Species of Wild Animals (CMS) as it has an unfavourable conservation status or would benefit significantly from international co-operation organised by tailored agreements. The Mediterranean population of the short-beaked common dolphin is also listed on Appendix I, as this population has been categorized as being in danger of extinction throughout all or a significant proportion of their range and CMS Parties strive towards strictly protecting these animals, conserving or restoring the places where they live, mitigating obstacles to migration and controlling other factors that might endanger them. In addition, the species is also covered by the Agreement on the Conservation of Small Cetaceans of the Baltic, North East Atlantic, Irish and North Seas (ASCOBANS) and the Agreement on the Conservation of Cetaceans in the Black Sea, Mediterranean Sea and Contiguous Atlantic Area (ACCOBAMS).

Mass stranding events 
On June 8, 2009, a mass-stranding event (MSE) occurred in Falmouth Bay, Cornwall, United Kingdom. It is believed the MSE was likely caused by naval involvement, as all other factors which cause MSEs in cetaceans currently appear unlikely to have influenced the event. During the event, twenty-six common dolphins washed ashore, and about the same amount floated back out to sea. There were three other MSEs in the UK before this event, all of unknown cause, from the years 1915 to 1938, but with arguably lower counts of stranded dolphins.

Captivity

Common dolphins are not common in captivity. But on at least three occasions, a beached common dolphin in California was nursed back to health at SeaWorld San Diego, but deemed unfit to release back to the ocean. These common dolphins remained at SeaWorld with the bottlenose dolphin exhibit. On one occasion, a male common dolphin managed to impregnate one of the female bottlenose dolphins in the exhibit, leading to four hybrid births. One of the resulting common dolphin/bottlenose dolphin hybrids remained at SeaWorld, San Diego (alternately under the name Cindy or Bullet) while the other (named CJ) was kept at Discovery Cove, and was moved to SeaWorld Orlando in 2016.

Other than at SeaWorld, at least 90 common dolphins are known to have been captured from the wild and kept in captivity. Captured common dolphins are said to be difficult to keep in captivity.

The behavior of captive common dolphins is not very well studied. However, a study was conducted in New Zealand of common dolphin reacting to swimmers at Marineland. Unlike bottlenose dolphins (which demonstrated antagonistic or sexual behaviors), the common dolphins retreated to the refuge center of the pool, where swimmers were not allowed. They did not leave the refuge section until the swimmers left. The dolphins also surfaced much more frequently, which is a possible indicator of stress. Aggressive and playful behavior among the dolphins decreased when swimmers were present. This behavior is consistent with wild common dolphins off of New Zealand, as they actively avoid swimmers.

See also

List of cetaceans
Marine biology

References

Further reading
Rice, Dale W. (1998). Marine mammals of the world: systematics and distribution. Society of Marine Mammalogy Special Publication Number 4. 231 pp.
Encyclopedia of Marine Mammals 
Whales, Dolphins and Porpoises, Mark Carwardine, 
 Heptner, V. G.; Nasimovich, A. A; Bannikov, Andrei Grigorevich; Hoffmann, Robert S, Mammals of the Soviet Union, Volume II, part 3 (1996). Washington, D.C. : Smithsonian Institution Libraries and National Science Foundation

External links

Whale and Dolphin Conservation Society

Oceanic dolphins
Mammals described in 1758
Cetaceans of Europe
Cetaceans of the Indian Ocean
Cetaceans of the Pacific Ocean
Mammals of Southeast Asia
Taxa named by Carl Linnaeus